Martin Prusek (born December 11, 1975) is a Czech ice hockey coach and former professional ice hockey goaltender. During his playing career, Prusek appeared in 57 games in the National Hockey League (NHL) with the Ottawa Senators and Columbus Blue Jackets. Prusek currently serves as the goaltending coach for HC Vítkovice Steel of the Czech Extraliga.

Playing career
Martin Prusek started his professional ice hockey career in 1994 when he joined HC Vitkovice of the Czech Extraliga. After playing there for five seasons, Prusek was drafted by the Ottawa Senators in the sixth round of the 1999 NHL Entry Draft with the 164th overall pick. He made his North American debut with the Grand Rapids Griffins of the American Hockey League during the 2001–02 season. He also made his National Hockey League debut that same season, appearing in one game with the Senators.

Prusek appeared in 47 games with the Senators over the following two seasons, compiling a record of 28-8-4.  During the 2004–05 NHL lockout, he returned to the Czech Republic to play for Vitkovice and HC JME Znojemští Orli.  He came back to North America for the 2005–06 season, joining the Columbus Blue Jackets.  After spending most of the 2005–06 season with the Blue Jackets AHL affiliate Syracuse Crunch, Prusek left North America and joined SKA Saint Petersburg in the Russian Super League. During 2007–08, he rejoined HC Vitkovice in the Czech Extraliga. In 2008-09 Prusek played in Kontinental Hockey League and after a brief contract with HC Spartak Moscow, he joined Dinamo Riga for 2 seasons. After the 2009-10 season, Prusek once again rejoined HC Vítkovice Steel. Although he suffered from carditis  and played just in 2 Extraliga games during all the 2010-11 season, he reached a silver medal.

In summer 2011, he stepped into HC Vítkovice Steel pre-season players' camp, but on July 26 he announced his retirement decision and also he accepted the club's offer for the position of goaltender coach.

Career statistics

Regular season and playoffs

Awards
 Hap Holmes Memorial Award (lowest GAA in AHL): 2001–02 season (with Mathieu Chouinard and Simon Lajeunesse)

International achievements 
Martin Prusek's first international team game was the game against Russia on December 17, 1995 in Moscow.

External links
 

1975 births
Living people
Binghamton Senators players
Columbus Blue Jackets players
Czech ice hockey goaltenders
Dinamo Riga players
Czech expatriate ice hockey players in Russia
Grand Rapids Griffins players
HC Spartak Moscow players
HC Vítkovice players
Ottawa Senators draft picks
Ottawa Senators players
Sportspeople from Ostrava
SKA Saint Petersburg players
Syracuse Crunch players
Czech expatriate ice hockey players in Canada
Czech expatriate ice hockey players in the United States
Czech expatriate sportspeople in Latvia
Expatriate ice hockey players in Latvia